William Earl Lee Sr. (August 19, 1911 – June 23, 1998) was an American football player.

Lee played in 82 career games while starting in 60 of them. He played in each game of his first two seasons with the Dodgers; after playing five games with the Dodgers, he was moved to the Green Bay Packers, where he played in four games. In his next four seasons, he played in every game of those seasons. He played in just one game of the 1942 season, and he played in just four games in 1946. Lee is one of ten players that were named to the National Football League 1930s All-Decade Team that have not been inducted into the Pro Football Hall of Fame.

References

External links

1911 births
1998 deaths
American football tackles
Alabama Crimson Tide football players
Brooklyn Dodgers (NFL) players
Green Bay Packers players
All-American college football players
People from Eutaw, Alabama
Players of American football from Alabama